Druga strana (Other Side) is an album by the Croatian rock band Thompson. It was released in December, 2008. The album is a compilation of re-recorded B-sides previously released by the group. Prior to its release it was known under the working title B strana.

Tracks

References

Thompson (band) albums
2008 albums